USS Dreadnought (SP-584), later USS SP-584, was a United States Navy patrol vessel in commission from 1917 to 1919.

Dreadnought was built as a private fast "runabout" motorboat of the same name by R. Bigelow at Monument Beach, Massachusetts, in either 1916 or 1917. On 17 May 1917, the U.S. Navy acquired her from her owner, Eldon B. Keith of Brockton, Massachusetts, for use as a section patrol boat during World War I. She was commissioned as USS Dreadnought (SP-584) on 20 October 1917.

Assigned to the 5th Naval District, Dreadnought carried out patrol duties there for the rest of World War I. In 1918, she was renamed USS SP-584.

SP-584 was returned to her owner on 6 June 1919.

Dreadnought should not be confused with the tug USS Dreadnaught (ID-1951), later AT-34, which was in commission at the same time.

Notes

References
Department of the Navy Naval History and Heritage Command Online Library of Selected Images: Civilian Ships: Dreadnought (American Motor Boat). Served as USS Dreadnought (SP-584) and USS SP-584 in 1917-1919
NavSource Online: Section Patrol Craft Photo Archive SP-584 ex-Dreadnought (SP 584)

Patrol vessels of the United States Navy
World War I patrol vessels of the United States
Ships built in Boston
1916 ships
1917 ships